The Italian Cycling Federation or FCI (in Italian: Federazione Ciclistica Italiana) is the national governing body of cycle racing in Italy.

The FCI is a member of the UCI and the UEC.

Purpose

See also
Italy national cycling team

External links

Italy
Cycle racing organizations
Cycling
Cycle racing in Italy
Sports organizations established in 1894